06 may refer to:
 6 (number)
 The month of June, commonly referred to as 06
 The years 1906 and 2006, both commonly referred to as '06
 Lynk & Co 06, a Chinese subcompact SUV
 Sonic '06, a 2006 game of the Sonic the Hedgehog series
 O-Six, a female gray wolf shot by a hunter in Wyoming which led to extensive media coverage due to her popularity
Whanganui, New Zealand, which has the telephone area code 06.

See also
O6 (disambiguation)
6 (disambiguation)